White Hall is a historic home located at Ellicott City, Howard County, Maryland, United States. It consists of three sections: the east wing, dating from the early 19th century, the center section, and the west wing. In 1890 the house was partially destroyed by fire and rebuilt in 1900.  Three outbuildings remain on the White Hall property: a small square frame workshop; a smokehouse-privy; and springhouse.

White Hall was listed on the National Register of Historic Places in 1977.

Early owners were Caleb Dorsey and his brother Charles Worthington Dorsey (1787-1864), the first County commissioner of the Howard District of Anne Arundel County. Charles Worthington purchased the home in 1828 from Alfred and Ann Dashiel and N.G. Ridgley. with an original building onsite. He built additions to the home in 1857 hiring the architect Nathan G. Starkweather. The home was given to Dorsey's daughter and Maryland Governor Thomas Watkins Ligon (1810-1881). Charles Worthington died at the residence on 26 May 1864. Governor Ligon died at the estate in 1881. His wife, Mary Tolley Dorsey Ligon, died in 1899. The house was passed down throughout the family for well over one hundred years.  Cared for and owned by the Ligon and Hains family (Ligon and Hains family wed July 4, 1930). In 1965, Col Thomas Watkins Ligon sold 350 acres of surrounding land, leaving 41.3 surrounding the property.  The Hains family kept the estate until the late 1990s when it was sold to the first non-family member. In 1976 a 41.3 acre easement of the property was registered to the Maryland historical Trust.

See also
List of Howard County properties in the Maryland Historical Trust
Gray Rock (Ellicott City, Maryland)

References

External links
, including photo from 1976, at Maryland Historical Trust

Houses on the National Register of Historic Places in Maryland
Federal architecture in Maryland
Howard County, Maryland landmarks
Houses in Howard County, Maryland
Buildings and structures in Ellicott City, Maryland
Houses completed in 1828
National Register of Historic Places in Howard County, Maryland